Snydertown is an unincorporated community and census-designated place in Walker and Marion townships in Centre County, Pennsylvania, United States. As of the 2010 census, the population was 483.

The village center lies in Walker Township in the Nittany Valley, between the communities of Hublersburg and Nittany near Pennsylvania Route 64. The CDP boundaries extend west to include a residential development on the summit and slopes of Sand Ridge. Interstate 80 in Marion Township on the northwestern side of Sand Ridge forms the northwestern boundary of the CDP, although there is no direct access at this point.

References

Census-designated places in Centre County, Pennsylvania
Census-designated places in Pennsylvania